Mel Kampmann (10 January 1930 - 12 July 2016) was the creator of Action News.

References

2016 deaths